FC Dnipro-2 was the reserve team of FC Dnipro.

History
The club initially competed in the Dnipropetrovsk Oblast competition as FC Dnipro-2 Dnipropetrovsk .

In 1997 the club was entered into the professional leagues to compete in the Second League.

In 2004, when the PFL organised a competition for reserve teams of Premier League clubs the club moved into that competition.

In 2010 the club was entered as Dnipro's third team in the professional leagues as Dnipro-2.

Honours
Ukrainian Druha Liha: 1

1999/2000 Champions Group C

League and cup history

Dnipro-2
{|class="wikitable"
|-bgcolor="#efefef"
! Season
! Div.
! Pos.
! Pl.
! W
! D
! L
! GS
! GA
! P
!Domestic Cup
!colspan=2|Europe
!Notes
|-
|align=center|1997–98
|align=center|3rd "B"
|align=center|7
|align=center|32
|align=center|11
|align=center|10
|align=center|11
|align=center|41
|align=center|40
|align=center|43
|align=center|1/128 finals
|align=center|
|align=center|
|align=center|
|-
|align=center|1998–99
|align=center|3rd "C"
|align=center|7
|align=center|26
|align=center|13
|align=center|5
|align=center|8
|align=center|22
|align=center|23
|align=center|44
|align=center|Did not Enter
|align=center|
|align=center|
|align=center|
|-
|align=center|1999-00
|align=center|3rd "C"
|align=center bgcolor=gold|1
|align=center|26
|align=center|17
|align=center|6
|align=center|3
|align=center|44
|align=center|15
|align=center|57
|align=center|1/8 finals Second League Cup
|align=center|
|align=center|
|align=center bgcolor=green|Promoted
|-
|align=center|2000–01
|align=center|2nd
|align=center|11
|align=center|34
|align=center|13
|align=center|4
|align=center|17
|align=center|41
|align=center|43
|align=center|43
|align=center|
|align=center|
|align=center|
|align=center|
|-
|align=center|2001–02
|align=center|2nd
|align=center|17
|align=center|34
|align=center|8
|align=center|7
|align=center|19
|align=center|29
|align=center|48
|align=center|31
|align=center|
|align=center|
|align=center|
|align=center bgcolor=red|Relegated
|-
|align=center|2002–03
|align=center|3rd "C"
|align=center|8
|align=center|28
|align=center|10
|align=center|4
|align=center|14
|align=center|28
|align=center|34
|align=center|34
|align=center|
|align=center|
|align=center|
|align=center|
|-
|align=center|2003–04
|align=center|3rd "C"
|align=center|12
|align=center|30
|align=center|9
|align=center|2
|align=center|19
|align=center|36
|align=center|56
|align=center|23
|align=center|
|align=center|
|align=center|
|align=center|Club moves to Reserve competition
|-
!colspan="14" align=center| Club revives its second team as FC Dnipro-75 Dnipropetrovsk was expelled in 2010.
|-
|align=center|2010–11
|align=center|3rd "B"
|align=center|12
|align=center|22
|align=center|3
|align=center|3
|align=center|16
|align=center|13
|align=center|41
|align=center|9
|align=center|
|align=center|
|align=center|
|align=center|−3
|-
|align=center|2011–12
|align=center|3rd "B"
|align=center|11
|align=center|26
|align=center|6
|align=center|5
|align=center|15
|align=center|24
|align=center|42
|align=center|23
|align=center|
|align=center|
|align=center|
|align=center|
|}

See also
FC Dnipro
FC Dnipro-75 Dnipropetrovsk

References

External links
Official website

 
1997 establishments in Ukraine
2012 disestablishments in Ukraine
Football clubs in Dnipro
FC Dnipro
Ukrainian reserve football teams
Defunct football clubs in Ukraine
Association football clubs established in 1997
Association football clubs disestablished in 2012